Vlastimir Jovanović (Serbian Cyrillic: Властимир Јовановић; born 3 April 1985) is a Bosnian footballer who plays as a defensive midfielder for Bruk-Bet Termalica Nieciecza.

Club career
Jovanović signed a 3-year contract with Turkish club Manisaspor in July 2009, but returned to Slavija shortly after.

On 22 July 2010, he signed a 3-year contract with Ekstraklasa club Korona Kielce

International career
He made his debut for Bosnia and Herzegovina in a January 2008 friendly match away against Japan and has earned a total of 3 caps, scoring no goals. His final international was a June 2009 friendly against Uzbekistan.

Personal life
Since August 2017, Jovanović holds Polish citizenship.

References

External links
 
 

1985 births
Living people
People from Doboj
Naturalized citizens of Poland
Serbs of Bosnia and Herzegovina
Association football midfielders
Bosnia and Herzegovina footballers
Bosnia and Herzegovina international footballers
FK Sloga Doboj players
FK Slavija Sarajevo players
Manisaspor footballers
Korona Kielce players
Bruk-Bet Termalica Nieciecza players
First League of the Republika Srpska players
Premier League of Bosnia and Herzegovina players
Ekstraklasa players
I liga players
Bosnia and Herzegovina expatriate footballers
Expatriate footballers in Turkey
Bosnia and Herzegovina expatriate sportspeople in Turkey
Expatriate footballers in Poland
Bosnia and Herzegovina expatriate sportspeople in Poland